Below is a list of the busiest railway stations in Europe. Train stations with more than 30 million passengers per year are shown.

Only data from national networks is shown. Notably, the London stations only include figures on the National Rail network and not journeys on the London Underground network, while the Paris stations include all journeys on the SNCF mainline network and RER, but not the Paris Métro. The number of platforms generally includes only mainline trains; for Paris, that includes Transilien and RER but excludes Métro.

List

See also
List of highest railway stations in Europe
List of busiest railway stations in Great Britain
List of busiest railway stations in North America

Notes

References

Busiest
Busiest railway stations in Europe